Win That Girl is a lost 1928 silent film comedy directed by David Butler and starring David Rollins and Sue Carol. It was produced and distributed by Fox Film Corporation. The film while silent, had a synchronized soundtrack of music and sound effects.

Cast
David Rollins - Johnny Norton III
Sue Carol - Gloria Havens
Tom Elliott - Larry Brawn III
Roscoe Karns - Johnny Norton II
Olin Francis - Larry Brawn II
Mack Fluker - Johnny Norton I
Sidney Bracey - Larry Brawn I
Janet McLeod - Clara Gentle
Maxine Shelly - 1880 Girl
Betty Recklaw - 1905 Girl

See also
1937 Fox vault fire

References

External links
 Win That Girl at IMDb.com

1928 films
Lost American films
American silent feature films
Films directed by David Butler
Fox Film films
American black-and-white films
Silent American comedy films
1928 comedy films
1920s American films